Cynthia Kristina Kurleto is an Austrian model, actress, and a former MTV VJ in the Philippines. She is known for being a commercial model and an FHM model in the Philippines and also for playing the role of Cassiopea in the hit series Encantadia and its prequel/sequel Etheria. She was born to an Austrian father and Filipino mother.

Biography
The daughter of Faustina Verdillo and Friedrich Kurleto, following her parents' divorce, she was raised by her mother in Austria where she grew up. Cindy finished her education from elementary to college and took a Hotel and Restaurant Management course. She later became a waitress. In 2001, she left her job and decided to take a vacation in her other home country, the Philippines. She sold her car and apartment, quit her job, bought a ticket, packed one suitcase and left for the Philippines. Long after arriving, she decided to settle in Legazpi City, Albay for good. It was during her hosting stint at a local ABS-CBN show in Legazpi that she was spotted by a talent scout and offered to do modelling jobs in Manila. 

She shot into stardom as one of the Palmolive girls. Her first crack at showbiz was when she became a co-host to ABS-CBN's Masayang Tanghali Bayan for more than a year. When it went off the air, she was taken in as MTV video jockey.

Her first movie was Jerry Lopez Sineneng's Ngayong Nandito Ka (2003) with Kristine Hermosa, Jericho Rosales and Onemig Bondoc.

Kurleto was declared FHM's "Sexiest Woman of the World" in 2004 after she appeared on the cover of FHM Philippines in April 2004.

She became a co-host in the longest noontime variety show "Eat Bulaga!" and mainstay in Sundays' comedy show "Daddy Di Do Du". She left Eat Bulaga! in November 2007. Her co-hosts at Eat Bulaga! supported her decision.

She returned to Eat Bulaga! on March 9, 2019 as a guest player in Boom!

Kurleto is now married to Barbadian British businessman, Daniel Joseph Navalia.

Filmography

Television shows

Films

Awards
Ranked # 3 - FHM Philippines' 100 Sexiest Women in the World 2003
Ranked # 2 (# 1 Philippines' Finest) - FHM Philippines' 100 Sexiest Women in the World 2004
Ranked # 5 - FHM Philippines' 100 Sexiest Women in the World 2005
Ranked # 7 - FHM Philippines' 100 Sexiest Women in the World 2006

References

External links
Cindy Kurleto's official website
Cindy Kurleto's photos on FHM.com.ph

 Kurleto's photo gallery

1981 births
Filipino television actresses
Filipino television personalities
Filipino female models
Filipino people of Austrian descent
Living people
Musicians from Vienna
VJs (media personalities)
Filipino television variety show hosts
ABS-CBN personalities
GMA Network personalities